Mišel Matičević (born 22 April 1970) is a German film, television and theater actor of Croatian descent.

Early life and education
Matičević was born in West Berlin to Croatian parents who were guest workers in West Germany. Following his parents' divorce, he lived with his mother in Berlin-Spandau. He was initially a trouble maker in childhood and would get in fistfights at school. He refused to join the school's theater group, feeling it was only for kids who were trying to "suck up" to the teachers. However, Matičević saw the 1983 film Danton  with Gérard Depardieu and was inspired by Depardieu's performance to become an actor.

He studied acting from 1994 until 1998 at the Konrad Wolf Film University of Babelsberg in Potsdam. While there, he performed with the Berliner Ensemble at the Deutsches Theater in Berlin and the Kleist Theater in Frankfurt Oder.

Career
Since 1996, Matičević has acted in several crime series and films for German television and cinema. He was awarded the Best Actor Award at the 2000 Thessaloniki International Film Festival for his performance in Lost Killers (1999).
In 2007, he played the role of the German poet and novelist Clemens Brentano in the film Das Gelübde, which depicts Brentano's encounter with the stigmatised nun Anne Catherine Emmerich.

Matičević's first international role was in the TNT miniseries The Company in 2006, a show about the CIA in which he played a fictional Hungarian poet called Arpad Zelk, a leader of the Hungarian uprising in 1956.

Personal life
Since 2014, Matičević has been an ambassador for Deutschlandstiftung Integration (Germany Integration Foundation), which promotes and celebrates ethnic diversity in Germany, to support the children of guest workers. He has said: "Guest worker children have always existed and will always exist. I deliberately don't say migrants, but guest worker children, because I am also a guest worker child and have learned so much. I just do not like the term migrant. And I'm glad to be able to pass on some of my knowledge and experience."

Selected filmography

Film

Television

References

External links

 

1970 births
Living people
German male film actors
German people of Croatian descent
German male television actors
Male actors from Berlin
20th-century German male actors
21st-century German male actors